Lake Segozero is a large freshwater lake in the Republic of Karelia, northwestern part of Russia. The Segezha is a major outflow from Segozero and it empties to Vygozero. After the hydroelectric power plant was built on Segezha River the surface area of Segozero have risen from 815 km² to 906 km².

Lakes of the Republic of Karelia
LSegozero